Elections Prince Edward Island is the Prince Edward Island non-partisan agency of the legislative assembly charged with running provincial elections, referendums, and municipal elections.

References

External links

Prince Edward Island
Politics of Prince Edward Island